Royal Air Force Christchurch or more simply RAF Christchurch is a former Royal Air Force satellite station and was located southeast of the A337/B3059 junction in Somerford, Christchurch, Dorset, England.

Christchurch Airfield was a civil airfield that started operation from 1926, enlarged for wartime operations in 1941, Christchurch was used during World War II by the Royal Air Force and the United States Army Air Forces Ninth Air Force. It returned to civilian flying postwar before being taken over by what became British Aerospace to manufacture jet fighters and civilian airliner types. The airfield complex was finally closed down and demolished in 1966 when housing was built on the site.

History

USAAF use

In 1943, the USAAF Ninth Air Force required several temporary advanced landing grounds along the southern English Channel coast prior to the Normandy invasion to provide tactical air support for the ground forces landing in France.  Christchurch was provided to support this mission.

Christchurch was known as USAAF Station AAF-416 for security reasons by the USAAF during the war, and by which it was referred to instead of location.  Its USAAF Station Code was "CH".

405th Fighter Group
Christchurch airfield saw the arrival of the USAAF 405th Fighter Group on 4 April 1944, the group arriving from Walterboro Army Airfield South Carolina. The 405th had the following operational squadrons:
 509th Fighter Squadron (G9)
 510th Fighter Squadron (2Z)
 511th Fighter Squadron (K4)

The 405th was a group of Ninth Air Force's 84th Fighter Wing, IX Tactical Air Command.  It flew the Republic P-47D Thunderbolt.  The 405th moved to its Advanced Landing Ground at Picauville, France (ALG A-8) on 22 June 1944, ending the USAAF's use of Christchurch.

Additional units:

Current use
The airfield complex was demolished in 1966 and there is housing and The Runway Industrial Park located on the site.

See also

List of former Royal Air Force stations

References

Citations

Bibliography

 Freeman, Roger A. (1994) UK Airfields of the Ninth: Then and Now 1994. After the Battle 
 Freeman, Roger A. (1996) The Ninth Air Force in Colour: UK and the Continent-World War Two. After the Battle 
 Maurer, Maurer (1983). Air Force Combat Units Of World War II. Maxwell AFB, Alabama: Office of Air Force History. .

Further reading
 White, Allen (1987) Christchurch Airfield - 40 Years Of Flying

External links
 [ArmyAirForces.com 404th Fighter Group  https://web.archive.org/web/20070930013102/http://www.armyairforces.com/dbgroups.asp?Group=226]
 Aerial Photo of RAF Christchurch from Multimap.Com
 Photos of the 405FG at Christchurch. 

History of Christchurch, Dorset
Airfields of the IX Fighter Command in the United Kingdom
Buildings and structures demolished in 1966
Royal Air Force stations in Dorset
Royal Air Force stations in Hampshire